The Cheat is a 1931 American pre-Code drama film directed by George Abbott and starring Tallulah Bankhead and Harvey Stephens. The film is a remake of the 1915 silent film of the same title, directed by Cecil B. DeMille.

Plot
Elsa Carlyle (Tallulah Bankhead), in contrast to her charming personality and loving relationship with her indulgent husband, Jeffrey (Harvey Stephens), is a compulsive gambler and spendthrift who is overly concerned with social standing and appearances.

Jeffrey tries to convince Elsa to avoid spending while he makes investments in an effort to provide them with enough wealth to live comfortably for the rest of their lives, but she had impulsively placed a large bet and immediately is $10,000 in debt. Later, after helping raise money for a charitable cause, she steals this money and invests it in a stock scheme, and promptly loses it as well when the stock tanks. Hardy Livingston (Irving Pichel), a wealthy lady's man, has his eye on Elsa and finds his chance to trap her into an adulterous affair by giving her the money she needs to repay the charity money.

The next day Jeffrey informs her his investments have paid off and they are now fabulously wealthy. She attempts to repay the money she had borrowed from Livingston, however he wants sexual favors instead. Elsa says she would rather commit suicide; Livingston hands her a pistol and invites her to do so and when she does not, he brands her on the left side of her chest and she responds by taking the pistol and shooting him.

A suspicious Jeffrey has followed her and takes the blame for the shooting. As Jeffrey is on trial, Livingstone claims Jeffrey had tried to cheat him out of a debt and then shot him. To protect Elsa, Jeffrey refuses to deny this, and so Elsa stops the trial by shouting out the truth and showing the court the brand Livingstone had placed on her. The judge drops the charges against Jeffrey, Elsa promises again to stop gambling and the film ends.

Cast
 Tallulah Bankhead as Elsa Carlyle
 Harvey Stephens as Jeffrey Carlyle
 Irving Pichel as Hardy Livingstone
 Jay Fassett as Terrell
 Ann Andrews as Mrs. Albright
 William Ingersoll as Croupier
 Hanaki Yoshiwara as Japanese Servant
 Willard Dashiell as Judge
 Edward Keane as Defense Attorney
 Robert Strange as District Attorney
 Ruth Donnelly as Woman in Court Behind Elsa (uncredited)
 Jimmy Granato as Orchestra Musician (uncredited)
 Porter Hall as Leslie (uncredited)
 Arthur Hohl as Defense Attorney (uncredited)
 Millard Mitchell as Courtroom Spectator (uncredited)
 Henry Warwick as Butler (uncredited)

References

External links

Stills at pre-code.com

1931 films
American black-and-white films
Remakes of American films
Sound film remakes of silent films
American drama films
1931 drama films
1930s American films